Thomas Fearon was Chief Justice of Jamaica from 1756 to 1764.

References 

Chief justices of Jamaica
Year of birth missing
Year of death missing
18th-century Jamaican judges